Kotra may refer to :

 KOTRA, a Korean trade promotion organization

Places 
In India:
 Kotra tehsil, a tehsil in Udaipur district, Rajasthan state
 Kotra, Uttar Pradesh, a town in Jalaun district, Uttar Pradesh state
 Kotra, Berasia tehsil, Bhopal, a village in Madhya Pradesh
 Kotra, Huzur tehsil, Bhopal, a village in Madhya Pradesh

Elsewhere:
 Kotra, Pakistan, a city in Pakistan
 Kotra River, a river in Belarus and Lithuania

See also
 Kotra Pitha, a former princely state on Saurashtra peninsula in Gujarat